Tomáš Janči is a male former international table tennis player from Slovakia.

He won a bronze medal at the 1991 World Table Tennis Championships in the Swaythling Cup (men's team event) with Roland Vimi, Petr Javurek, Petr Korbel and Milan Grman for Czechoslovakia.

He competed in the 1992 Olympics.

See also
 List of table tennis players
 List of World Table Tennis Championships medalists

References

Sportspeople from Dunajská Streda
Slovak male table tennis players
Table tennis players at the 1992 Summer Olympics
1968 births
Living people
World Table Tennis Championships medalists